Al-Rihaniyya was a Palestinian Arab village in the Haifa Subdistrict. It was depopulated during the 1947–1948 Civil War in Mandatory Palestine on 30 April 1948 as part of the battle of Mishmar HaEmek. It was located 25 km southeast of Haifa and 3 km northwest of Wadi al-Mileh.

History
In  1882, the PEF's  Survey of Western Palestine described  Kh. Rihaneh as a ruined modern village, with watch-towers in ruins, and with two springs.

A population list from about 1887 showed that Rihaneh had about 190 inhabitants; all Muslims.

Al-Rihaniyya had an elementary school for boys founded in 1888, but it was closed during the British Mandate period.

British Mandate era
In the 1922 census of Palestine, conducted by the  British Mandate authorities,  Al Rehaniyeh  had a population of 266 Muslims,   increasing in the   1931 census to 293 Muslim, in a total of  55  houses.

In the   1945 statistics,  the  village had a population of 240 Muslims,  and the village's lands spanned 1,930  dunams. Of this,   1,761  dunums of land were used for  cereals;  73 dunums were irrigated or used for orchards,  while 46 dunams were built-up (urban) land.

1948, aftermath
On 5 April 1948, after fighting broke out in the area, the Haganah General Staff  instructed the Golani Brigade that they should tell  four Arab villages that they were no longer safe, and should evacuate. Among the villages were Abu Shusha,  Daliyat al Ruha and Rihaniya.  According to Ben Gurion, on 8 or 9 April,  a delegation from Mishmar HaEmek had told him that it was "imperative to expel the Arabs [in the area] and to burn the villages."

On 14 April, The New York Times reported that Al-Rihaniyya was occupied, together with   Daliyat al Ruha and  Al-Butaymat. However Khalidi  believes that the actual depopulation only happened two weeks later, during  Passover Clearing.

Surviving villagers  told Rosemarie Esber  that they decided to leave Al-Rihaniyya on 30 April, as "we did not have guns to defend it." They took refugee in Umm az-Zinat, but when the Haganah attacked it (according to the villagers: unprovoked) they fled "with nothing but our clothes on", to Ijzim. They stayed at Ijzim for several months, until it also was attacked by Zionist forces, who  "kicked everybody out." Esbers informants ended up in Umm al-Fahm.

Following the war the area was incorporated into the State of Israel, with the village's lands taken over by kibbutz Ramat HaShofet and  the moshav of Ein HaEmek.

In 1992 the village site was described: "The rubble of the houses lies in piles that are covered with dirt, bushes, and thorns. The village cemetery (now covered with cactuses) and a well are visible at the bottom of a hill north of the site. Large sections of the adjacent land are used for agriculture; to the south there is an avocado orchard."

References

Bibliography

External links
 Welcome To al-Rihaniyya
al-Rihaniyya, Zochrot
Survey of Western Palestine, Map 8: IAA,  Wikimedia commons

Arab villages depopulated during the 1948 Arab–Israeli War
District of Haifa